The National Library of Cameroon is the national library of Cameroon (Bibliothèque nationale du Cameroun). It was established in 1966 and it is located in Yaoundé.

According to the United Nations, as of 2010 approximately 71 percent of adult Cameroonians are literate.

See also 
 Literature of Cameroon
 National Archives of Cameroon
 List of national libraries

References

Bibliography
  
  . (Brief mention of the library in national context)

Libraries in Cameroon
Cameroon
Libraries established in 1966
1966 establishments in Cameroon
Yaoundé